Phan Văn Khải (25 December 1933 – 17 March 2018) was a Vietnamese politician who served as the fifth Prime Minister of Vietnam from 25 September 1997 until his resignation on 27 June 2006. He is considered as a technocratic, innovative and benevolent leader.

Life and career
Phan Văn Khải was born on 25 December 1933 in Tan Thong Hoi Commune Củ Chi District, Saigon in French Indochina. Already during his youth he worked in revolutionary organizations. After the end of the first Indochina War and the subsequent partition of the country, Pham Van Khai took the opportunity to emigrate to North Vietnam.

Phan Văn Khải joined the revolution in 1947 and became member of the Communist Party of Vietnam on 15 July 1959.

From 1954 to 1959, he studied and worked on land reform in North Vietnam, he then studied languages, at the University of Economics in Moscow Soviet Union, until 1965.

After the war Phan Văn Khải was temporarily mayor of Ho Chi Minh City. From September 24, 1997 to June 24, 2006, he served as Prime Minister of the Socialist Republic of Vietnam. He became the first Prime Minister of Vietnam to visit United States, meeting with President George W. Bush. On June 24, 2006, he announced his resignation, along with President Trần Đức Lương.

In the period from 15 December 1998 to 5 November 2001 he also served as chairman of ASEAN.

Phan Văn Khải was considered as a moderate reformer who acted in support of the country's economic opening within the political range of Vietnam. He died on 17 March 2018 at his home in Ho Chi Minh City.

Personal life
His wife was Nguyễn Thị Sáu, former deputy director of Ho Chi Minh City's Planning and Investment Department. She died in 2012. According to the media, he has a son, Phan Minh Hoan, and a daughter, Phan Thi Bach Yen.

Awards
:
 Grand Cordon of the Order of the Rising Sun (November 2006)

References

External links
Vietnamese Embassy biography

1933 births
2018 deaths
People from Ho Chi Minh City
Moscow State University alumni
Prime Ministers of Vietnam
Deputy Prime Ministers of Vietnam
Members of the National Assembly (Vietnam)
Members of the 7th Politburo of the Communist Party of Vietnam
Members of the Standing Committee of the 8th Politburo of the Communist Party of Vietnam
Members of the 8th Politburo of the Communist Party of Vietnam
Members of the 9th Politburo of the Communist Party of Vietnam
Alternates of the 5th Central Committee of the Communist Party of Vietnam
Members of the 5th Central Committee of the Communist Party of Vietnam
Members of the 6th Central Committee of the Communist Party of Vietnam
Members of the 7th Central Committee of the Communist Party of Vietnam
Members of the 8th Central Committee of the Communist Party of Vietnam
Members of the 9th Central Committee of the Communist Party of Vietnam
Grand Cordons of the Order of the Rising Sun